Michel Lethiec is a French classical clarinetist.

Michel Lethiec has played with the Sinfonia Finlandia, the St. Petersburg Philharmonic, the English Chamber Orchestra, the Orchestre national du Capitole de Toulouse, the Salzburg Mozarteum,  the Prague Radio Orchestra, and the Philharmonique de Radio France. He has premiered works by several composers, including Krzysztof Penderecki and John Corigliano. He has been teaching music at the Paris Conservatory until 2016. He is also artistic director of the Pablo Casals Festival.

Discography
Larsson: 12 Concertinos, Op 45, 1991
Kurtag - Ligeti - Pesson, 1997
Mozart Clarinet Quintet''', 1999Krzysztof PENDERECKI: Concertos pour clarinette, 2000Jean-Baptiste Vanhal: Concertos for clarinet, oboe and bassoon, 2003
 Theodore Gouvy: Septet, Ottetto and Petite Suite Gauloise, 2004 (conducting Les Solistes de Prades and recorded by K617) Penderecki: Sextet, Clarinet Quartet, 2003Eternal Penderecki, 2008Gershwin, G.: Clarinet and Strings Music'', 2009

References 

French classical clarinetists
20th-century French musicians
21st-century French musicians
Living people
21st-century clarinetists
Year of birth missing (living people)